Norberto Davidds-Garrido Jr. (born October 4, 1972) is a former American football offensive lineman.

High school career
Garrido prepped at William Workman High School in City of Industry, California.

College career
Garrido graduated from the University of Southern California after transferring from Mount San Antonio College.

Professional career
Garrido was selected with the 106th pick in the fourth round of the 1996 NFL Draft by the Carolina Panthers.  He played with them until 1999.  In 2000, he played for the Arizona Cardinals.

1972 births
Living people
People from the San Gabriel Valley
USC Trojans football players
Carolina Panthers players
American football offensive tackles
Arizona Cardinals players
American sportspeople of Mexican descent
Players of American football from California
Sportspeople from Los Angeles County, California
People from La Puente, California